Jenny Toitgans (28 March 1905 – 22 October 1986) was a Belgian athlete. She competed in the women's discus throw at the 1928 Summer Olympics.

References

1905 births
1986 deaths
Athletes (track and field) at the 1928 Summer Olympics
Belgian female discus throwers
Olympic athletes of Belgium
Place of birth missing